Eric Ken Shinseki (born November 28, 1942) is a retired United States Army general who served as the seventh United States Secretary of Veterans Affairs (2009–2014). His final United States Army post was as the 34th Chief of Staff of the Army (1999–2003). Shinseki is a veteran of two tours of combat in the Vietnam War, in which he was awarded three Bronze Star Medals for valor and two Purple Hearts. He was the first Asian-American four-star general, and the first Asian-American Secretary of Veterans Affairs.

Early life and education

Shinseki was born in Lihue, Kauai, in the then Territory of Hawaii, to an American family of Japanese ancestry. His grandparents emigrated from Hiroshima to Hawaii in 1901. He grew up in a sugarcane plantation community on Kaua'i and graduated from Kaua'i High and Intermediate School in 1960. While attending Kaua'i he was active in the Boy Scouts and served as class president. As a boy, Shinseki learned that three of his uncles had served in the 442nd Infantry Regiment, a unit of Japanese Americans that became one of the most decorated fighting units in United States history. Motivated by his uncles' example, he attended the United States Military Academy and graduated in 1965 with a Bachelor of Science degree and a commission as a second lieutenant. He earned a Master of Arts degree in English Literature from Duke University in 1974. He was also educated at the Armor Officer Advanced Course, the United States Army Command and General Staff College, and the National War College of National Defense University.

Military service

Shinseki served in a variety of command and staff assignments in the Continental United States and overseas, including two combat tours with the 9th and 25th Infantry Divisions in the Republic of Vietnam as an artillery forward observer and as commander of Troop A, 3rd Squadron, 5th Cavalry Regiment during the Vietnam War. During one of those tours while serving as a forward artillery observer, he stepped on a land mine, which blew the front off one of his feet; after spending almost a year recovering from his injuries, he returned to active duty in 1971.

Shinseki has served at Schofield Barracks, Hawai'i, with Headquarters, United States Army Hawaii, and Fort Shafter with Headquarters, United States Army Pacific. He has taught at the U.S. Military Academy's Department of English. During duty with the 3rd Armored Cavalry Regiment at Fort Bliss, Texas, he served as the regimental adjutant and as the executive officer of its 1st Squadron.

Shinseki's ten-plus years of service in Europe included assignments as Commander, 3rd Squadron, 7th Cavalry, 3rd Infantry Division (Schweinfurt); Commander, 2nd Brigade, 3rd Infantry Division (Kitzingen); Assistant Chief of Staff, G3, 3rd Infantry Division (Operations, Plans and Training) (Würzburg); and Assistant Division Commander for Maneuver, 3rd Infantry Division (Schweinfurt). The 3rd Division was organized at that time as a heavy mechanized division. He also served as Assistant Chief of Staff, G3 (Operations, Plans, and Training), VII Corps (Stuttgart). Shinseki served as Deputy Chief of Staff for Support, Allied Land Forces Southern Europe (Verona), an element of the Allied Forces Southern Europe.

From March 1994 to July 1995, Shinseki commanded the 1st Cavalry Division at Fort Hood, Texas. In July 1996, he was promoted to lieutenant general and became Deputy Chief of Staff for Operations and Plans, United States Army. In June 1997, Shinseki was appointed to the rank of general before assuming duties as Commanding General, Seventh United States Army; Commander, Allied Land Forces Central Europe; and Commander, NATO Stabilization Force in Bosnia and Herzegovina. Shinseki became the Army's 28th Vice Chief of Staff on November 24, 1998, then became its 34th Chief of Staff on June 22, 1999. Shinseki retired on June 11, 2003 at the end of his four-year term. His Farewell Memo contained some of his ideas regarding the future of the military. At that time, General Shinseki retired from the Army after 38 years of military service.

, Shinseki was the highest-ranked Asian American in the history of the United States. Additionally, as of 2004, he is the highest-ranked Japanese American to have served in the United States Armed Forces.

Army Chief of Staff

During his tenure as Army Chief of Staff, Shinseki initiated an innovative but controversial plan to make the army more strategically deployable and mobile in urban terrain by creating Stryker Interim-Force Brigade Combat Teams. He conceived a long term strategic plan for the army dubbed "Objective Force", which included a program he designed, Future Combat Systems. One other controversial plan that Shinseki implemented was the wearing of the black beret for all army personnel. Prior to Shinseki implementing this policy, only the United States Army Rangers could wear the black beret. When the black beret was given to all soldiers and officers, the Rangers moved to the tan beret.

Shinseki publicly clashed with Secretary of Defense Donald Rumsfeld during the planning of the war in Iraq over how many troops the United States would need to keep in Iraq for the postwar occupation of that country. As Army Chief of Staff, Shinseki testified to the United States Senate Committee on Armed Services on February 25, 2003, that "something in the order of several hundred thousand soldiers" would probably be required for postwar Iraq. This was an estimate far higher than the figure being proposed by Secretary Rumsfeld in his invasion plan, and it was rejected in strong language by both Rumsfeld and his Deputy Secretary of Defense, Paul Wolfowitz, who was another chief planner of the invasion and occupation. From then on, Shinseki's influence on the Joint Chiefs of Staff reportedly waned. Critics of the Bush Administration alleged that Shinseki was forced into early retirement as Army Chief of Staff because of his comments on troop levels; however, his retirement was announced nearly a year before those comments. According to a 2003 book "State of Denial," Shinseki had been tapped by Al Gore to be the next Chairman of the Joint Chiefs of Staff, if Al Gore had won the 2000 Presidential election. However Al Gore lost the 2000 Presidential election to George W. Bush and instead of Shinseki, Bush chose Vice Chairman of the Joint Chiefs of Staff, Air Force General Richard B. Myers as the next Chairman of the Joint Chiefs of Staff. Many believed that this was the primary reason Shinseki had been on the opposite side concerning the Bush administration's military policy, constantly criticizing the administration.

When the insurgency took hold in postwar Iraq, Shinseki's comments and their public rejection by the civilian leadership were often cited by those who felt the Bush administration deployed too few troops to Iraq. On November 15, 2006, in testimony before Congress, CENTCOM Commander General John Abizaid said that Shinseki had been correct that more troops were needed.

Post-military career

Shinseki has served as a director for several corporations: Honeywell International and Ducommun, military contractors; Grove Farm Corporation; First Hawaiian Bank; and Guardian Life Insurance Company of America. He is a member of the Advisory Boards at the Center for Public Leadership, John F. Kennedy School of Government, Harvard University, and to the U.S. Comptroller General. He is a member of the Council on Foreign Relations, the Atlantic Council of the United States, and the Association of the United States Army.

United States Secretary of Veterans Affairs (2009–2014)
On December 7, 2008, then-President-elect Barack Obama announced at a press conference in Chicago that he would nominate Shinseki to become the Secretary of Veterans Affairs. Shinseki was unanimously confirmed by the United States Senate on January 20, 2009, and sworn in the next day.

Veterans Health Administration scandal

In May 2014, Shinseki was embroiled in a scandal involving the Veterans Health Administration, which is a component of the United States Department of Veterans Affairs. Questions involving substandard timely care and false records covering up related timelines had come to light, involving treatment of veterans in a number of veterans hospitals. On May 30, 2014, President Obama announced that he had accepted Shinseki's resignation as Secretary. Shinseki said he could not explain the lack of integrity among some leaders in veterans healthcare facilities: "That breach of integrity is irresponsible, it is indefensible, and unacceptable to me." He said he could not defend what happened because it was indefensible, but he could take responsibility for it and he would. Shinseki's resignation meant that 2014 was the first time since 2000 that there had not been an Asian American in the Cabinet of the United States.
 
In an interview with retired General Peter W. Chiarelli, journalist Robert Siegel described the situation as "a case of a very, very good man who's run up against some pretty terrible problems in his job," to which Chiarelli responded, "I don't look up to any man more than I look up to Eric Shinseki."

Family
Shinseki is married to his high school sweetheart, Patricia; they are the parents of two children, Lori and Ken. He also has seven grandchildren.

Awards, decorations, and badges
Shinseki was awarded the following medals, ribbons, badges, and tabs:

Notes

References

 VA Official Biography
 Official U.S. Army biography , in Bell, William Gardner. Commanding Generals and Chiefs of Staff 1775–2005: Portraits & Biographical Sketches of the United States Army's Senior Officer, United States Army Center of Military History, 2005.

Further reading

 Dickey, Connie. "Chief of Staff shares his concerns for the soldier and the Army", ARNEWS, June 28, 1999. From media interview 3 days after becoming Army Chief of Staff. (URL retrieved May 27, 2006)
 Moulin, Pierre. " Commentary: Eric Shinseki Gallery", Fort DeRussy – U.S. Army Museum of Hawaii, April 2008. 
 Siemieniec, Jack. "Chief of Staff expands on Army Vision" , ARNEWS, January 31, 2000. (URL retrieved May 27, 2006)
  Boyer, Peter J.. A Different War – Is the Army becoming irrelevant? The New Yorker, July 1, 2002.

External links

Biography at the United States Department of Veterans Affairs

NYTimes article on cabinet post
(
Eric K. Shinseki Collection (while CSA)  US Army Heritage and Education Center, Carlisle, Pennsylvania
Eric K. Shinseki Gallery Fort DeRussy Army Museum of Hawaii

|-

|-

|-

|-

1942 births
Living people
21st-century American politicians
American amputees
American military personnel of Japanese descent
United States Army personnel of the Vietnam War
American politicians of Japanese descent
Japanese-American members of the Cabinet of the United States
Duke University alumni
Honeywell people
Landmine victims 
National War College alumni
Obama administration cabinet members
People from Kauai County, Hawaii
People from Lihue, Hawaii
Recipients of the Air Medal
Recipients of the Coast Guard Distinguished Service Medal
Recipients of the Defense Distinguished Service Medal
Recipients of the Distinguished Service Medal (US Army)
Recipients of the Legion of Merit
United States Army Chiefs of Staff
United States Army Command and General Staff College alumni
United States Army Vice Chiefs of Staff
United States Military Academy alumni
United States Secretaries of Veterans Affairs
Atlantic Council
Recipients of the Navy Distinguished Service Medal
Recipients of the Order of Military Merit (Brazil)